Lindsay Yoan Zouma (born 6 May 1998) is an English professional footballer who plays as a centre-back for Maidstone United on loan from National League club Dagenham & Redbridge.

Career
He joined Bolton Wanderers on a two-year contract from Angers SCO on 13 August 2018 and joined Bolton's U23 team. He made his professional debut on 3 August 2019 as Bolton began their EFL League One season with a 2–0 loss at Wycombe Wanderers, with his club playing an unfamiliar line-up due to their financial crisis. On 26 June it was announced Zouma would be one of 14 senior players released at the end of his contract on 30 June. 

On 1 October 2020, Zouma joined League Two side Barrow. On 1 March 2021, Zouma joined National League side Altrincham on a one-month loan deal. The loan was then extended for the remainder of the 2020–21 season. On 18 May 2021, Barrow announced he would be released at the end of his contract.

On 18 December 2021, he signed for National League side Dagenham & Redbridge. On 10 February 2022, he was suspended by Dagenham & Redbridge for his role in filming his brother, Kurt, kicking and slapping his pet cat. Zouma made his return to Dagenham's team on 8 March 2022, being named in the 16-man squad to play Yeovil Town. On 6 January 2023, he signed for Maidstone United for the remainder of the 2022–23 season.

Personal life
His older brothers are West Ham United and France defender Kurt Zouma, and Lionel Zouma. Their parents emigrated from the Central African Republic.

Animal abuse
On 7 February 2022, footage emerged of Kurt Zouma kicking and slapping his cat, filmed at his home by Yoan. On 16 March 2022, the RSPCA announced that after a full investigation they had started the process of bringing a prosecution against both Kurt and Yoan Zouma under the Animal Welfare Act.

On 24 May 2022, Yoan Zouma pleaded guilty to one count of aiding, abetting, counselling or procuring his brother to commit an offence, after Kurt Zouma pleaded guilty to two counts of causing unnecessary suffering to a protected animal.

Career statistics

Notes

References

1998 births
Living people
French footballers
Association football defenders
FC Vaulx-en-Velin players
Angers SCO players
Olympique Lyonnais players
Bolton Wanderers F.C. players
Barrow A.F.C. players
Altrincham F.C. players
Dagenham & Redbridge F.C. players
Maidstone United F.C. players
Championnat National 3 players
English Football League players
National League (English football) players
French expatriate footballers
Expatriate footballers in England
French expatriate sportspeople in England
French sportspeople of Central African Republic descent
People convicted of cruelty to animals